Praia da Varandinha is a beach on the southwest coast of the island of Boa Vista in Cape Verde. It lies north of the headland Ponta Varandinha. The beach forms part of the protected area Morro de Areia Nature Reserve.

See also
List of beaches of Cape Verde

References

Beaches of Cape Verde
Geography of Boa Vista, Cape Verde